Need ei vaata tagasi... (These won't look back...) is a 5-CD compilation by Estonian rock band Ruja. The purpose of this project was to release the whole of Ruja's works, although many songs are absent from the compilation.

Osa 1 (Part 1) contains the first 2 CD-s. It is followed by "Need ei vaata tagasi... Osa 2".

Track listing

CD1: Parandamatu (Irreparable)
 Õhtunägemus (Evening vision) (Rannap/Juhan Viiding) – 4:03 (1972)
 Tsepeliini triumf (Zeppelin's triumf) (Rannap/Viiding) – 6:14 (1971)
 Rukkilõikus (Rye harvest) (Traditional/Viiding) – 3:41 (1972)
 Nii vaikseks kõik on jäänud (It has all become so quiet) (Rannap/Ernst Enno) – 3:31 (1971)
  (The drowning of a young photographer) (Rannap/Viiding) – 3:31 (1973)
 Pajats (Zany) (Rannap/Rimmel) – 2:31 (1973)
 Enne seda suurt nalja (Before that big joke) (Rannap/Viiding) – 1:42 (1973)
 Parandamatu (Irreparable) (Rannap/Viiding) – 2:25 (1973)
 Vana auruvedur (Old steam locomotive) (Rannap/Eha Lättemäe) – 3:30 (1974)
 Ikaros (Rannap/Ilus) – 4:09 (1975)
 Ah, ma teadsin... (Oh, I knew it...) (Rannap/Heiti Talvik) – 2:41 (1973)
 Laul näidendist "Protsess" (A song from the play "Process") (Rannap/Komissarov) – 3:45 (1975)
 Tütarlaps kloaagis (Young lady in cloaca) (Rannap/Viiding) – 2:24 (1972)
 Sügispäev (Autumn day) (Rannap/Sinervo) – 3:23 (1973)
 Ülemlaul (Song of songs) (Rannap/Viivi Luik) – 4:57 (1973)
  (These won't look back) (Rannap/Enno) – 3:59 (1971)
  (Who has songs to sing) (Rannap/Hando Runnel) – 3:38 (1979)
 Must lind (Black bird) (Rannap/Karl Eduard Sööt) – 5:33 (1981)
 Eesti muld ja Eesti süda (Estonian soil and Estonia's heart) (Rannap/Lydia Koidula) – 3:26 (1982)

CD2: Üle müüri (Over the wall)
 Mis saab sellest loomusevalust? (What will become of this pain of human nature) (Nõgisto/Alliksaar) – 7:33 (1976)
 Ei mullast (Not from the ground) (Kappel/Runnel) – 2:43 (1978)
 Avanemine (Opening) (Tüür/Erkki-Sven Tüür) – 4:19 (1978)
 Üleminek (Changeover) (Nõgisto) – 1:55 (1976)
  (Song of a snail) (Kappel/Viiding) – 2:24 (1977)
 Klaperjaht (Chase) (Kappel/Viiding) – 1:11 (1976)
 Põhi, lõuna, ida, lääs... (North, South, East, West...) (Nõgisto/Viiding) – 6:05 (1978)
 Isamaa (Fatherland) (Kappel/Runnel) – 1:07 (1977)
 Ajaloo õppetund (A lesson in history) (Nõgisto/Viiding) – 2:32 (1978)
 Elupõline kaja (Life-indigenous echo) (Nõgisto/Viiding) – 4:49 (1978)
 Omaette (By itself) (Nõgisto/Viiding) – 2:40 (1978)
 Ha, ha, ha, ha (Couplet in Estonian) (Nõgisto/Viiding) – 4:15 (1978)
 Keldrikakand (Rough woodlouse) (Kappel/Runnel) – 0:58 (1977)
 Perekondlik (Familial) (Rannap/Runnel) – 3:38 (1979)
 Miks on teile jumalat vaja? (Why do you need God?) (Peeter Volkonski/Mati Unt) – 3:19 (1979)
 Kassimäng (Cat's play) (Nõgisto) – 2:49 (1977)
 Läänemere lained (Waves of the Baltic Sea) (Nõgisto/Juhan Liiv) – 3:13 (1977)
 Üle müüri (Over the wall) (Nõgisto/Viiding) – 3:39 (1977)
 Kaks pihtimust (Two confessions) (Kappel/Alender) – 7:44 (1976)
 Ahtumine (Narrowing) (Kappel/Artur Alliksaar) – 8:03 (1976)
Note: the two last tracks, "Kaks pihtimust" & "Ahtumine", are incorrectly switched on the back cover and in the booklet. There is also another song titled "Ahtumine", which is also on "Need ei vaata tagasi... Osa 2".

Personnel

Parandamatu
 Urmas Alender – vocals
 Jaanus Nõgisto – guitars
 Rein Rannap – keyboards
 Tiit Haagma – bass
 Raul Sepper – bass (4)
 Andrus Vaht – percussion
 Jaan Karp – percussion (14–19)
 Andres Põldroo – guitar (3, 13)
 Toomas Veenre – guitar (2, 4)
 Tõnu Kaljuste's chamber choir (1, 12, 16)
 Mixed choir "Noorus" (15, 17)

Üle müüri
 Urmas Alender – vocals
 Jaanus Nõgisto – guitars
 Margus Kappel – keyboards
 Priit Kuulberg – bass
 Ivo Varts – percussion
 Tiit Haagma – bass (1, 17–20)
 Andrus Vaht – percussion (1, 6, 14, 17–20)

Ruja albums
1999 compilation albums
Estonian-language albums